Angus Whare Shelford (born 2 October 1976 in Otahuhu, New Zealand) is a boxer from New Zealand, who competed at the 2000 Summer Olympics in Sydney. There he was defeated in the first round of the Super Heavyweight (+ 91 kg) division by Oleksil Mazikin of Ukraine.

References

1976 births
Living people
Olympic boxers of New Zealand
Boxers at the 2000 Summer Olympics
New Zealand male boxers
Super-heavyweight boxers